Helmut Zacharias (27 January 192028 February 2002) was a German violinist and composer who created over 400 works and sold 14 million records. He also appeared in a number of films, usually playing musicians.

Early life
Helmut Zacharias was born in Berlin.  His father Karl was a violinist and conductor, and his mother was a singer. He started having lessons from his father at the age of 2 and a half and at 6 he played at the Faun club, a cabaret venue on the Friedrichstraße in Berlin.

At the age of 8, Zacharias became the youngest student in Gustav Havemann's masterclass at the Berlin Academy of Music. Aged 11, he played on radio for the first time with a performance of Mozart's Violin Concerto No. 3 in G major and began touring in 1934 at the age of 14. At this time, in the 1930s, the records of Django Reinhardt and Stéphane Grappelli's all-string jazz band were available in Germany and they heavily influenced Zacharias's musical style.

Musical career
In 1940, Zacharias was discovered by Lindström-Electrola (then-name of the German branch of EMI) and in 1941 had his first mainstream success with Schönes Wetter Heute. By the 1950s, he was considered to be one of the best jazz violinists of Europe and was dubbed "The Magic Violinist" and "Germany's Mr. Violin". In 1956 he achieved his greatest success in the United States with the release of "When the White Lilacs Bloom Again" which, on 22 September, reached number 12 on the Billboard Hot 100. On 21 November 1964 he reached number 9 in the UK Singles Chart with Tokyo Melody following its use as theme music for the BBC's coverage of the 1964 Summer Olympics.  Zacharias moved to Switzerland in the late 1950s and continued playing with many other famous artists, including Yehudi Menuhin. From 1968 to 1973 he appeared in his own television show. In 1985, he was awarded the Order of Merit of the Federal Republic of Germany.

Death
Zacharias had been detected as suffering from Alzheimer's disease in 1995 and retired from public life in 1997 before the fact was publicly acknowledged on World Alzheimer's Day in 2000. He died in 2002 in Brissago, Switzerland and is buried in Ohlsdorf Cemetery in Hamburg.

Personal life
Zacharias was married to Hella (née Konradat) from 1943 until his death. Together they had two sons, Stephan and Thomas, and a daughter, Sylvia. Stephan, born in 1956, is a composer whose credits include the soundtrack to Academy Award-nominated film Downfall while Thomas was an international athlete.

Discography
12 Violin Sonatas, Op.2 (Vivaldi) (1953)
Ich liebe deinen Mund (1955)
Hello, Scandinavia (1958)
Holiday in Spain (1959)
Two Million Strings with Werner Müller (1959)
Songs of Old Russia (1959)
Candelight Serenade (1960)
The Best of Everything (1961)
A Violin Sings (1962)
On Lovers' Road (1963)
Candlelight Serenade (1965)
De Gouden Plaat Van Helmut Zacharias (1967)
Happy Strings Happy Hits (1967)
James Last Meets Helmut Zacharias (1967)
Happy Strings of Zacharias (1968)
Light My Fire (1968)
Mexico Melody (1968)
Zacharias Plays The Hits (1969)
Zacharias Plays Verdi & Puccini (1970)
Zacharias Plays Verdi & Bizet (1970)
Greatest Hits (1973)
Buenos Días (1974)
Swinging Hits (1977)
Les Belles Années (1978)

Filmography

References

External links 
 Helmutzacharias.site.ms 
  Komponistenarchiv.de
 Archive.org

1920 births
2002 deaths
20th-century German musicians
20th-century violinists
Burials at the Ohlsdorf Cemetery
Deaths from Alzheimer's disease
Neurological disease deaths in Switzerland
Easy listening musicians
German composers
German jazz violinists
German male composers
German male violinists
Musicians from Berlin
Commanders Crosses of the Order of Merit of the Federal Republic of Germany
20th-century German male musicians
German male jazz musicians
Last-Becker Ensemble members